There have been two baronetcies created for persons with the surname Earle, one in the Baronetage of England and one in the Baronetage of the United Kingdom. One creation is extant as of 2007.

The Earle Baronetcy, of Stragglethorpe in the County of Lincoln, was created in the Baronetage of the United Kingdom on 2 July 1629 for Richard Earle. The title became extinct on the death of the fourth Baronet in 1697.

The Earle Baronetcy, of Allerton Tower in Woolton (South Liverpool) in the parish of Childwall in the County Palatine of Lancaster, was created in the Baronetage of the United Kingdom on 3 November 1869 for the businessman and slave trader Hardman Earle. The Earle family descends from John Earle of Warrington. His son John settled in Liverpool and served as Mayor of the city in 1709. His grandson Thomas Earle, also a slave trader, was Mayor of Liverpool in 1787. He was the father of William Earle, Mayor of Liverpool in 1836, and of Sir Hardman Earle, 1st Baronet.

In the 1830s, when the British government emancipated the slaves, the Earles were compensated to the tune of over £25,000 for the liberation of over 300 slaves over 12 estates across Antigua.

Earle baronets, of Stragglethorpe (1629)
Augustine Earle purchased the Manor of Stragglethorpe from the Lacon family in 1608, who in turn had brought it off the Rygge family a few years before. The Lacon and Rygges were related by marriage. Besides Richard, he had a further 5 children by his then third wife, Francis, who was sister to Sir Thomas Coney of Bassingthorpe. The BishopsTranscripts for Stragglethorpe contain some details of the Births, Deaths and Marriages in the hamlet. Augustine was buried in the Chapel of Stragglethorpe in 1636 and his will, dated 20th July 1636, can be downloaded from the National Archives.
Sir Richard Earle, 1st Baronet ( - bur 27th March 1667)
Sir Richard Earle, 2nd Baronet (bapt c.1652 - bur 6th July 1678)
Sir Richard Earle, 3rd Baronet (bapt 11th Nov 1629 - bur 13th Dec  1679)
Sir Richard Earle, 4th Baronet (bapt 11th July 1672 – bur 20th August 1697)

Earle baronets, of Allerton Tower (1869)

Sir Hardman Earle, 1st Baronet (1792–1877)
Sir Thomas Earle, 2nd Baronet (1820–1900)
Sir Henry Earle, 3rd Baronet (1854–1939)
Sir (Thomas) Algernon Earle, 4th Baronet (1860–1945)
Sir Hardman Alexander Mort Earle, 5th Baronet (1902–1979)
Sir Hardman George Algernon Earle, 6th Baronet (born 1932)

The heir apparent is Robert George Bligh Earle (born 1970)
The heir apparent's heir apparent is Laszlo Thomas Bligh Earle (born 2008)

Notes

References
Kidd, Charles, Williamson, David (editors). Debrett's Peerage and Baronetage (1990 edition). New York: St Martin's Press, 1990.

EARLE OF ALLERTON TOWER. By T. Algernon Earle. – Family History of the Allerton Earle Family
'Townships: Allerton', in A History of the County of Lancaster: Volume 3, ed. William Farrer and J Brownbill (London, 1907), pp. 128–131. [British History Online http://www.british-history.ac.uk/vch/lancs/vol3/pp128-131]  [Retrieved 28 March 2022].

External links
Painting of Sir Hardman Earle, 1st Baronet
History of the Earle family
Obituary of Sir Hardman Earle, 1st Baronet Liverpool Journal  – Deaths and inquests 27th, Jan 1877 – The death of Sir Hardman EARLE

Earle
Earle